Lake Cliff is a freshwater lake in the northern part of the Oak Cliff area of Dallas, Texas (USA).

Location 
Lake Cliff is located inside the Marsalis, Beckley, West Davis, Zang Boundaries.

History 
Lake Cliff was constructed between 1899 and 1900 and was originally called "Lake Llewellyn."  It is speculated that Thomas L. Marsalis originally helped to plan the construction of the lake in the summer of 1899.  In July 1900, Marsalis sued the lake's builders citing "errors in construction."

References

External links 
 Beautiful Lake Cliff, clean, cool, delightful: the Southwest's greatest playground; it's in Dallas published 1906, hosted by the Portal to Texas History.

Lakes of Dallas